Eva Pavlovna Levina-Rozengolts, (Russian еавловна розенгольц; 1898 Vitebsk – 18 August 1975, Moscow) was a Russian painter and printmaker.

Life 
She attended the Alexander Gymnasium in Vitebsk, graduating in 1914. During World War I, she served as a nurse in a military hospital. In 1917, she received her dentist's degree from the University of Tomsk.  From 1917 to 1918, she lived in Moscow and took private drawing and sculpture lessons from Stepan Erzia . After the October Revolution , and Russian Civil War,  in early 1919, she returned to Vitebsk.

In 1920, Rosenholz returned to Moscow and continued her artistic training with Anna Golubkina .  At the same time, she began studying in the higher artistic and technical workshops in the workshop of Robert Falk, which she completed in 1925 with the title of artist and the right to travel abroad.  She married the writer, Boris Mikhailovich Levin (1899-1940) from Vitebsk.

Rosenholz exhibited her works at the Society of Moscow Painters exhibition and the Belarusian Art Exhibition in Minsk . In 1926 she traveled to France and England. In 1927-1928 she took part in the exhibitions of the ROSTA news agency and the Association of Art Activists in Moscow. In 1929 she began studying higher pedagogical courses at the Higher Artistic-Technical Institute in Moscow. From 1932, she worked as an artist for fabric painting in the Dorogomilovo factory. In 1934, she became a senior adviser for textile design at the People's Commissariat for light engineering in Moscow. The main focus of her work was pastel painting.  In 1937, she participated in the interior design of the Soviet pavilion at the 1937 World Exhibition in Paris .  At the beginning of the World War II, she was evacuated to Chistopol. In 1942 she returned to Moscow.

In August 1949, as part of the campaign against the Rootless Cosmopolitans, Rosenholz was arrested and sentenced to 10 years in exile in the Krasnoyarsk Territory by the Ministry of State Security .  There she was a lumberjack, painter, barge letterer, and nurse. From 1954 to 1956 she worked in Karaganda as a stage designer in the Kazakh Dramaturgical Theater.

In 1956, Rosenholz was rehabilitated, and she returned to Moscow. She now worked exclusively with graphics, preferring ink drawings with brush or pen and pastel painting. She created a series of picture cycles.  The largest collection of her drawings is now owned by the Pushkin Museum. The Tretyakov Gallery also exhibits her works, as do many Russian and foreign private collections.

Rosenholz' older brother was the People's Commissar Arkady Rosengolts. Her cousin was the poet Elena Shirman.

References 

1898 births
1975 deaths
Russian artists